Stockport railway station in Stockport, Greater Manchester, England, is 8 miles south-east of Manchester Piccadilly on the West Coast Main Line to London Euston.

History

The Manchester and Birmingham Railway opened in stages from Manchester and reached Stockport in 1840. The  line ran from a temporary station in Manchester to another in Stockport at the north end of the uncompleted Stockport Viaduct. The temporary station, which was later renamed Heaton Norris, was Stockport's only station for more than two years. After the viaduct was completed, the M&BR built a station at its southern end as an experiment. The decision was prompted by complaints that the first station was a long way from the industrial parts of town and even farther from the residential districts on the south side. The second station opened on 15 February 1843 as Edgeley. By 1844, it was the town's principal station. Heaton Norris, at the north end of the viaduct, closed in 1959.

The station was operated by the London and North Western Railway and became part of the London Midland and Scottish Railway in 1923.  In 1948, British Railways ran the system.

Most lines into the station were electrified at 25 kV AC, using overhead wires, under the British Railways 1955 Modernisation Plan; however, not all of the local lines were electrified.

Facilities
The station is positioned at high level above the valley of the River Mersey and with lifts that link a pedestrian underpass to central Stockport and Edgeley.

The station is staffed, has a ticket office and ticket machines, customer service points, shops, toilets, waiting rooms, lifts from the station subway and step-free access to the platforms.

In 2009, the station was identified as one of the ten worst category B interchange stations for mystery shopper assessment of fabric and environment and received a share of £50m funding for improvements.

Services

Current passenger routes

The two southbound West Coast Main Line routes run via .

The Stockport to Stalybridge Line, via Guide Bridge, no longer has a regular passenger service. It was reduced from an hourly shuttle service to a once a week, one direction only skeleton service in the early 1990s. It now has two services a week, one in each direction on Saturday mornings.

The main concourse opened in September 2004 in a development that included a new platform (platform 0) that only became fully operational at the beginning of March 2008. A pedestrian subway leads to the island platforms, which have a buffet and newsagent.

The Monday–Saturday off-peak service pattern in trains per hour (tph) is:

Avanti West Coast
3 tph to 
1 tph to  via  and 
CrossCountry
4 tpd to  via  and 
East Midlands Railway
1 tph to  via 
1 tph to  via  and 
TransPennine Express
1 tph to 
1 tph to  via  
Transport for Wales Rail
1 tph to 
1 tph to / via  and 
Northern Trains
6 tph to 
1 tph to 
1 tph to 
1 tph to 
1 tph to 
1 tph to 
1 tph to 

Platform use

Platform 0 - Typically services to Hazel Grove, Buxton, Sheffield, Norwich, Nottingham and Cleethorpes (opened in 2003).

Platform 1 - southbound services to Macclesfield, Crewe, Stoke-on-Trent and Alderley Edge. It is also signalled for use by trains in the Manchester direction.

Platform 2 - southbound platform for services to Stoke-on-Trent, Chester, Crewe, Alderley Edge, services to South Wales, London, Bristol, Bournemouth, Paignton and Plymouth.

Platform 3 - mainly used by Fast services to Manchester Piccadilly along with services to Manchester Airport, Liverpool Lime Street, Blackpool North, Preston, Salford Crescent, Bolton, Wigan, Southport and Barrow-in-Furness.

Platform 3a - used by the weekly Parliamentary train from / to Stalybridge.

Platform 4 - mainly used by stopping services to Manchester Piccadilly along with services to Manchester Airport, Liverpool Lime Street, Blackpool North, Preston, Salford Crescent, Bolton, Wigan, Southport and Barrow-in-Furness.

Non-stopping trains 
It has been claimed that Stockport viaduct was built on condition that all passenger trains using it were required to stop at Stockport station. Local MP Andrew Gwynne commissioned research into the issue and reported "Sadly no such Act of Parliament exists, although it is common currency in the town that it does. I made enquiries with the House of Commons Library and the Parliamentary Archives back at the time some intercity trains stopped using Stockport. It appears it is purely an urban myth."

Interchange with other transport modes

Taxi 
Passengers can board taxis from the taxi rank located immediately outside the station entrance.

Bus 
The bus stops immediately outside the station were previously served by the Metroshuttle free bus service. This service was withdrawn in 2019, and as of 2020 the bus stops were only used by the infrequent service number 312 and occasionally rail replacement buses.

The station is a short walk from Stockport bus station where most services can be accessed. As part of Transport for Greater Manchester's Stockport Interchange project, a new bridge to improve the walking route between the two facilities is planned to be built.

Passengers can also use the bus stops on the nearby Wellington Road which are well-served by services,  especially the 192 between Manchester Piccadilly and Hazel Grove, that are mostly operated by Stagecoach Manchester.

Tram 

An extension to the Metrolink line from East Didsbury to Stockport was planned in 2004 and the Greater Manchester Passenger Transport Executive applied for powers to build it. The project came to a halt when the Big Bang extension was stopped due to the loss of potential funding. As a result, there is currently no tram interchange at Stockport station.

The proposed extension would have reused some of the former railway alignment, but some of it was built on or filled in after closure. This made re-opening more difficult and the proposed line would have included new infrastructure and street running sections to take it into Stockport. The line would have terminated at Stockport bus station.

See also 
Stockport Tiviot Dale railway station

References

Further reading

External links

Railway stations in the Metropolitan Borough of Stockport
DfT Category B stations
Former London and North Western Railway stations
Railway stations in Great Britain opened in 1843
Railway stations served by CrossCountry
Railway stations served by East Midlands Railway
Northern franchise railway stations
Railway stations served by TransPennine Express
Railway stations served by Transport for Wales Rail
Railway stations served by Avanti West Coast
1843 establishments in England
Proposed Manchester Metrolink tram stops
Stations on the West Coast Main Line
Transport in Stockport